Anthropod may refer to:

Anthropod, a podcast published by the Society for Cultural Anthropology
"Anthropod", a track on the experimental rock music album Experiment Below, by Hovercraft
Anthropods, a race of alien creatures in the computer game X-COM: Apocalypse
Anthropods, a single by Talons (band)

See also
 Arthropod, animals of the phylum Arthropoda, including insects, arachnids, myriapods and crustaceans
 Anthropoid (disambiguation)